Schang is a surname. Notable people with the surname include:
 David Schang, member of a family of 16th-century Scottish carpenters
 Wally Schang (1889-1965), Major League Baseball catcher
 Frederick Christian Schang (1893-1971), Talent agent and former president of Columbia Arts Management
 Bobby Schang (1886-1966), Pittsburgh Pirates catcher